IndyCar Racing II is a racing game developed by Papyrus Design Group. It is the sequel to IndyCar Racing, and was released in 1995 for the DOS, Mac OS and Windows. A little over a year later, the game was re-released, with a few minor upgrades, under the title CART Racing. The name change came about as a result of the CART series losing licensing rights to the name IndyCar, after the Indianapolis Motor Speedway and IRL lockout in 1996.

Gameplay
The game still used many contemporary drivers, chassis (Lola, Reynard, Penske) and engines (Ford-Cosworth, Mercedes-Benz, Honda). 15 circuits were included in this game with Miami (road course) and Indianapolis missing.

Development
This game is based on the 1989 game Indianapolis 500 and on Papyrus' 1993 IndyCar Racing. Little is known about the development of the game, but a demo for the game was released in 1995, and several patches for the DOS and Windows 95 were created after the game's release to improve it. This game could be run in SVGA (640x480) and had some other changes in comparison with IndyCar Racing, such as allowing outside cameras by pressing the F10 key. This was very useful on flat courses like the Cleveland airport track.

Reception

IndyCar Racing II received generally good ratings, such as 7.8 out of 10 by GameSpot, and 4 out of 5 by Computer Games Magazine. Some reviewers commented on the extreme detail and customization of the racecar, and the ability to change any part. GameRevolution remarked: "There are thirteen different customizable characteristics to the car... You could spend an entire week inside the garage just fiddling with the many ways to improve your car's performance". Finally some reviewers commented on the realism of the game, such as GameSpot, who noted: "Even on the easiest of settings, driving an IndyCar is comparable to riding a wild bull".

Computer Games Strategy Plus named IndyCar Racing II the best computer racing simulation of 1995. Likewise, Macworld presented the game with its 1996 "Best Sports Game" award; the magazine's Steven Levy of the magazine wrote that "this champion of race games has just about everything". It was a runner-up for Computer Gaming Worlds 1995 "Simulation of the Year" award, which ultimately went to EF2000. The editors wrote that IndyCar Racing II "takes the already excellent IndyCar design and adds much-improved driver AI".

IndyCar II, alongside Papyrus's other games under the CART name, achieved combined sales above 800,000 units by January 1998. However, Gord Goble of GameSpot reported that the game itself pulled "less than fantastic sales figures", with 180,000 copies sold by 2004.

References

External links
IndyCar Racing II at MobyGames

1995 video games
DOS games
IndyCar Series video games
Classic Mac OS games
Papyrus Design Group games
Racing simulators
Sierra Entertainment games
Single-player video games
Video game sequels
Windows games
Video games developed in the United States